Yale School of the Environment (YSE) is a professional school of Yale University. It was founded to train foresters, and now trains environmental students through four 2-year degree programs (Master of Environmental Management, Master of Environmental Science, Master of Forestry, and Master of Forest Science), two 10-month mid-career programs, and a 5-year PhD program. Still offering forestry instruction, the school has the oldest graduate forestry program in the United States.

The school changed its name to the Yale School of the Environment in July 2020. It was previously the Yale School of Forestry & Environmental Studies.

History

The school was founded in 1900 as the Yale Forest School, to provide high-level forestry training suited to American conditions. At the urging of Yale alumnus Gifford Pinchot, his parents endowed the two-year postgraduate program. At the time Pinchot was serving as Bernhard Fernow's successor as Chief of the Division of Forestry (predecessor of the U.S. Forest Service, USFS). Pinchot released two foresters from the division to start the school: fellow Yale graduate Henry Solon Graves and James Toumey. Graves became the School's first dean and Toumey its second.

When the school opened, other places in the United States offered forestry training, but none had a post-graduate program. (Both Pinchot and Graves had gone to Europe to study forestry after graduating from Yale.) In the fall of 1900, the New York State College of Forestry at Cornell had 24 students, Biltmore Forest School 9, and Yale 7. Despite its small size, from its beginnings the school influenced American forestry. The first two chiefs of the USFS were Pinchot and Graves; the next three were graduates from the school's first decade. Wilderness and land conservation advocate Aldo Leopold graduated in the class of 1908.

In 1915, Yale School of Forestry's second dean, James Toumey, became one of the "charter members", along with William L. Bray of the New York State College of Forestry, by then reestablished at Syracuse University, and Raphael Zon, of the Ecological Society of America. In 1950, the "activist wing" of that society formed The Nature Conservancy.

Besides the school's own forests, Yale has used a number of other sites in the eastern United States for field education over the years. From 1904 to 1926, the summer session leading to a master's degree in forestry was held at Grey Towers and Forester's Hall in Milford, Pennsylvania. Beginning in 1912, Yale classes took occasional field trips to the land of the Crossett Lumber Company in Arkansas. For two decades from 1946 until 1966, the company provided the school a "camp," including cabins and a mess hall, used during spring coursework on forest management and wood products production. Yale students have also used a field camp at the Great Mountain Forest in northwestern Connecticut since 1941.

Reflective of the expanding variety of environmental interests, the school changed its name to the Yale School of Forestry & Environmental Studies in 1972. YSE hosts the bi-annual Yale Environmental Sustainability Summit. The school's 16th and present dean is Ingrid "Indy" Burke, who replaced Sir Peter Crane in October, 2016. The school changed its name to Yale School of the Environment in July 2020 and, within the school, created a distinct Forest School with dedicated faculty and degrees. It also teaches the Yale College undergraduate courses needed for the Environmental Studies major.

School buildings 

The school offers classes at Kroon Hall, Sage Hall, Greeley Labs, Marsh Hall, the Environmental Science Center, and the houses at 301 Prospect St. and 380 Edwards St.  Kroon Hall, the school's main building, is named for the philanthropist Richard Kroon (Yale Class of 1964). The building has  of space. It is "a showcase of the latest developments in green building technology, a healthy and supportive environment for work and study, and a beautiful building that actively connects students, faculty, staff, and visitors with the natural world." The building obtained Platinum Rating under the LEED certification system. It is designed by Hopkins Architects of London with Architect of Record Centerbrook Architects & Planners.  Goodfellow Inc from Delson, Quebec, supplied the glulam roof structure for this project.

School forest 
The school owns and manages  of forestland in Connecticut, New Hampshire, and Vermont. The Yale Myers Forest, in Union, Connecticut, donated to Yale in 1930 by alumnus George Hewitt Myers, is managed by the school as a multiple-use working forest. Yale-Toumey Forest, near Keene, New Hampshire, was set up by James W. Toumey (a former dean of the school) in 1913. Other Yale forestlands include Goss Woods, Crowell Forest, Cross Woods, Bowen Forest, and Crowell Ravine. A three-alarm fire burned several buildings within the Yale Myers Forest Camp on May 28, 2016.  The damaged camp buildings and a new research center were rebuilt in 2017.

Student life 

The school has an active tradition of student involvement in academic and extracurricular life. Many students take part in student interest groups, which organize events around environmental issues of interest to them. These groups range in interest from Conservation Finance and International Development, to the Built Environment and "Fresh & Salty: The Society for Marine and Coastal systems". There are also social and recreational groups, such as the Forestry Club, which every Friday organizes themed "TGIF" ("Thank-God-I'm-a-Forester") happy hours and school parties; the Polar Bear club, which swims monthly in Long Island Sound under the full moon (year-round); Veggie Dinner, which is a weekly vegetarian dinner club; the Loggerrhythms, an a cappella singing group; and the student-run BYO Café in Kroon Hall opened in 2010.  A notable YSE tradition is the extravagant environmentally inspired decoration of graduation caps in preparation for commencement.

Notable graduates 

 Frances Beinecke '71 BA, '74 MFS, President, Natural Resources Defense Council; member, National Commission on the BP Deepwater Horizon Oil Spill and Offshore Drilling (2010)
 Richard M. Brett, conservationist
 Ian Cheney '02 BA, '03 MEM, Emmy-nominated filmmaker
 William Wallace Covington,'76 PhD Regents' Professor, Northern Arizona University
Alphonse "Buddy" Fletcher Jr., '04 MEM
 Emanuel Fritz, professor known as "Mr. Redwood"
Carmen R. Guerrero Pérez '10 MEM, director of the Caribbean Environmental Protection Division of the Environmental Protection Agency
 William B. Greeley, Chief, U.S. Forest Service, 1920–1928
 Christopher T. Hanson '96 M.E.M./M.A.R. Chairman, Nuclear Regulatory Commission, 2021–
 Stuart L. Hart '76 MFS, academic addressing global poverty and economic development, professor emeritus at Cornell University
 Phillip Hoose '77 MFS, author
 Ralph Hosmer, pioneering Hawaiian forester
 Edward M. Kennedy Jr. '91 MES, attorney and Connecticut state senator
 Aldo Leopold '08, conservationist and author of A Sand County Almanac
 H. R. MacMillan, forester and industrialist
 John R. McGuire, Chief, U.S. Forest Service, 1972–1979
 Thornton T. Munger, pioneering U.S. Forest Service researcher; civic activist who helped create Portland, Oregon's Forest Park
 Mark Plotkin '81 MFS, ethnobotanist, explorer, and activist
 Robert Michael Pyle'76 PhD, lepidopterist and John-Burroughs-Medal–winning author, subject of The Dark Divide
 Samuel J. Record, botanist
 Ferdinand A. Silcox, Chief, U.S. Forest Service, 1933–1939
 David Martyn Smith, forester and educator, author of The Practice of Silviculture
 Robert Y. Stuart, Chief, U.S. Forest Service, 1928–1933
Dorceta E. Taylor ’85 MFS, ’91 PhD, environmental sociologist and preeminent scholars in the field of environmental justice, Yale University
Rae Wynn-Grant '10 MESc, large carnivore ecologist and a fellow with National Geographic Society.
Mirei Endara de Heras '94 MES, Panamanian government official and board member of Fundación Smithsonian
Eleanor J. Sterling '93 PhD, conservation scientist, American Museum of Natural History

References

External links 

 

Forestry
Forestry education
Forestry in the United States
History of forestry education
Educational institutions established in 1900
Environmental education in the United States
Environmental studies institutions in the United States
1900 establishments in Connecticut